Celebrity Coach Trip 6 is the sixth  series of Celebrity Coach Trip in the United Kingdom and the last series before the COVID-19 pandemic. The series began airing on E4 on 6 January 2020 for 15 episodes and concluded on 24 January 2020. The series began on Day 1 in Saint-Tropez and ended on Day 15 in Barcelona.

Voting system
The Voting system on this series was:
   card Days 1 to 14 was a yellow card and a red card to follow
  Day 15 was a vote to win

Contestants

Voting history

Notes
 On Day 4, Brendan announced that the two couples with the most votes would receive yellow cards.

 On Day 6, Brennan & Stephen received a yellow card and were required to vote for another couple, they chose Amy and Jonathan who received a red card.

 On Day 7, Georgia & Tommy received a red card, after their elimination, Brendan punished them for influencing the voting, by making the remaining couples vote for another couple, CiCi & Rusty then received a red card, and were not asked to cast their own vote.

 On Day 8, each couple voted for a couple to receive five days immunity, it was a tie between Adele & Kate and Woody & Kleiny, the others were asked to make a final decision, they chose Adele & Kate.

 On Day 11 to Day 13, Woody & Kleiny could not participate due to medical reasons. They return on Day 14.

 On Day 11, Louie withdrew, leaving Mr. Motivator to participate alone for that day, Louie was later replaced by Tim.

 On Day 13, Brendan announced that once everyone casts their vote, one couple's vote will be picked at random and whomever they chose would be eliminated regardless of the majority vote. Perri & Kadeena's names were chosen, meaning their vote for Alex & Brianne to be eliminated would be the only vote that counted. Mr. Motivator & Tim would have been eliminated otherwise.

The trip by day

References

Coach Trip series